Gobiopsis pinto, the snakehead goby, is a species of goby found in the Western Indian Ocean.

Size

Etymology
The fish is named in honor of Adolfo Abranches Pinto (1895-1981), the Military Commander of Mozambique, where this goby is endemic.

References

Gobiidae
Taxa named by J. L. B. Smith
Fish described in 1947